The American hip hop group Beastie Boys recorded 177 songs during their career. Active between 1982 and 2012, the group primarily consisted of Michael "Mike D" Diamond, Adam "MCA" Yauch, and Adam "Ad-Rock" Horovitz. Originally a hardcore punk band, the group released their debut single, "Cooky Puss" in 1983, which marked a change in style to a more hip-hop oriented sound. They fully transitioned to rap after signing with Def Jam Recordings in 1984.

With Rick Rubin's assistance on writing and producing, Beastie Boys released the singles "Rock Hard" (1984) and "She's on It" (1985), before releasing their debut studio album, Licensed to Ill (1986). The album blended rock and rap, and featured intricate wordplay between the three members. After leaving Def Jam and signing with Capitol Records, they released their second album, Paul's Boutique, in 1989. Co-produced with the Dust Brothers, the album's songs are almost entirely composed of samples, aside from the group's vocals. Paul's Boutique marked the group's longtime collaboration with Mario Caldato Jr. Check Your Head (1992) featured instrumentation from all three members and was less sample-heavy than their previous albums. The album was also more diverse, featuring elements of alternative and punk rock. Ill Communication (1994) continued the style of Check Your Head and featured their signature song, "Sabotage". Hello Nasty (1998)  featured bombastic beats, samples, and more experimentation than their previous albums. The anthology compilation album, The Sounds of Science (1999), contained previously unreleased songs, B-sides, and greatest hits.

To the 5 Boroughs (2004), their first studio album in six years, marked a return to the style of their early 1990s albums, and featured their signature blend of pop culture references and absurdity. The group's next album, the entirely instrumental The Mix-Up (2007), earned the group a Grammy Award for Best Pop Instrumental Album in 2008. In 2009, the group announced their next studio album, Hot Sauce Committee, as a two-part album. Pt. 1 was delayed after Yauch was diagnosed with cancer. A year later, Pt. 1 was shelved indefinitely. Pt. 2, released as Hot Sauce Committee Part Two (2011), contained experimentation reminiscent of Check Your Head and Hello Nasty, as well as old-school raps that contrasted with contemporary hip-hop trends. The album featured guest appearances by Nas and Santigold. A year later, on May 4, 2012, Adam Yauch died of cancer. After his death, Diamond and Horovitz disbanded the group out of respect for Yauch.

Songs

Notes

References

Bibliography
 
 
 

Music-related lists
Lists of songs recorded by American artists
Songs